Piloti  (Pilots) is an Italian sitcom, produced by  and aired on Rai 2 for three seasons starting in spring 2007.

Format and situation
The programme consists of five-minute unedited "sketch-com" episodes, three of which were broadcast every evening, five days a week. The first season began on 5 April 2007 and included 150 episodes; the second season began on 15 November 2008 and included 86 episodes; the third season of 180 episodes began on 20 April 2009.

The setting is a budget airline, Piccione Airlines, where Enrico Gasparini and Max Conti (Max Tortora) are pilots; many episodes take place in a cockpit. Some characters, including the company head (Gianni Quillico) and Gasparini's wife (Carla Chiarelli) are unseen, heard on the crew's mobile phones or on aircraft communications.

Gasparini and Conti first explored the budget airline setting in a 2003 RAI comedy, Bulldozer.

Cast
 Enrico Bertolino: Enrico Gasparini, pilot, with a Milanese accent, punctilious, with excellent English
 Max Tortora: Max Conti, copilot, with a Roman accent, sloppy, with little English
 : Silvana Bava, chief Flight attendant
 : Josephine Caratozzo, the other flight attendant, a beautiful Italian-American with her head in the clouds
 Giovanni Sanicola: Celeste, steward
 Gianni Quillico: head of Piccione Airlines (unseen)
 Carla Chiarelli: Gasparini's wife (unseen)
 Enrica Ajò: Cecilia, Gasparini's daughter
 Filippo Spagliardi: Tommaso, Gasparini's son
 Sergio Friscia: Arturo, Caratozzo's boyfriend
 Teresa Piergentili: Adelina, Conti's mother

Pamela Prati guest starred in Series 3 as the wife of an important politician.

Awards
Piloti won a 2008 Rose d'Or award in the sitcom category.

See also
List of Italian television series

References

External links
 
 Piloti at RAI, archived on 18 April 2014 , requires Adobe Flash
 Piloti on RaiPlay

Italian television series
RAI original programming